Seo Dong-myung (born 4 May 1974) is a South Korean football coach and former player. He played as a goalkeeper for South Korean under-23 team in the 1996 Summer Olympics. He was also selected as second-choice goalkeeper for South Korean senior team for the 1998 FIFA World Cup. After retirement, he coached K League clubs as a goalkeeping coach.

Honours 
Ulsan Hyundai Horang-i
K League 1: 1996, 2005
Korean Super Cup: 2006
A3 Champions Cup: 2006
Korean League Cup runner-up: 2002, 2005

Sangmu FC
Korean Semi-professional League (Autumn): 1998, 1999
Korean Semi-professional Championship: 1999

Jeonbuk Hyundai Motors
 Korean FA Cup: 2000

Individual
K League 1 Best XI: 2003

Notes

References

External links
 
 Seo Dong-myung at KFA 
 
 

1974 births
Living people
Association football goalkeepers
South Korean footballers
South Korea international footballers
Sportspeople from Gangwon Province, South Korea
Ulsan Hyundai FC players
Gimcheon Sangmu FC players
Jeonbuk Hyundai Motors players
Busan IPark players
K League 1 players
FC Seoul non-playing staff
1998 FIFA World Cup players
Footballers at the 1996 Summer Olympics
Olympic footballers of South Korea
South Korean Buddhists